Finding Dakota Grey is the first mixtape by American R&B and soul recording artist The World Famous Tony Williams released on March 2, 2010. The tape was released under the GOOD Music stamp. After solidifying himself in the industry for being the voice behind many of his cousin, Kanye West, and friend Jay Z's hits, Tony stepped front and center with his first solo project. Finding Dakota Grey features guest appearances from Dakota Grey, Kanye West, GLC, Mama Sol, S.O.S. (Nick and Nate), Prophetic, Al B. Back, Chop Chop, Al D., Matt Moerdock, Cello the Black Pearl, Tada, Nu Skyy and Really Doe.

Theme 
Tony Williams constructed this tape as his debut mainstream project and used this as an opportunity to introduce the world to an artist who he discovered, Dakota Grey. This project was a collection of original music, covers, and remixes. Tony tapped into a wide range of styles, from his signature soulful ballads and club bangers to a Brazilian hit where he sang on a hook in Portuguese. He experienced some musical chart success in France with the remix of Dreamin' Of Your Love.

Track listing 
From livemixtapes/Spinrilla.

References 

2010 mixtape albums